Enter The Light is the third album by Memphis rap artist Mr. Del. This album is the first album Mr. Del released following his departure from Three 6 Mafia and re-dedication to Jesus Christ. Unlike Del's first two albums, this album is Profanity-free and prominently features lyrics from a Christian worldview. Salt from Salt N Pepa appears on the remix to Shine

Track listing
Who Am I
Another Place [Featuring Michael Hawkins]
Holy Bounce
Shine
Who Got It
Good Thang
Escape The Night
Another Place [Remix]
Shine [Remix] [Featuring Salt of Salt N Pepa]
Can Of Life
Warfare
Be Ready [Featuring Shea Norman]
More Like You [Featuring Tonya Dyson & Will Graves]
So Real [Featuring Lea]

References

2000 albums
Mr. Del albums